The 1982 Munich WCT was a men's tennis tournament played on indoor carpet courts in Munich, West Germany. The tournament was part of the 1982 World Championship Tennis circuit. It was the fourth edition of the event and was held from 8 March through 14 March 1982. First-seeded Ivan Lendl won the singles title.

Finals

Singles
 Ivan Lendl defeated  Tomáš Šmíd 3–6, 6–3, 6–1, 6–2
 It was Lendl's 3rd singles title of the year and the 20th of his career.

Doubles
 Mark Edmondson /  Tomáš Šmíd defeated  Kevin Curren /  Steve Denton 4–6, 7–5, 6–2

References

External links
 ITF tournament edition details

Munich WCT
Munich WCT